= Ankur Narula =

Ankur Yoseph Narula is an Indian Pentecostal pastor based in Jalandhar, Punjab. He is the founder and senior pastor of the Church of Signs and Wonders, also known as Ankur Narula Ministries, which was established in Khambra village near Jalandhar in 2008.

== Early life and conversion to Christianity ==
Narula was born into a Hindu Khatri family in Punjab. He has described himself as being depressed and suicidal who at the point of death, turned to Christianity in 2004. He states that his conversion was influenced by a pastor who helped him overcome problems associated with depression.

== Ministry ==
Narula founded the Church of Signs and Wonders in Khambra village in 2008. The ministry grew into a major Pentecostal congregation in Punjab, attracting large numbers of worshippers to its prayer meetings and religious services.
